Bassoon Concerto may refer to:

 Bassoon concerto, a concerto for bassoon accompanied by a musical ensemble
 Bassoon Concerto (Jolivet)
 Bassoon Concerto (Mozart)
 Bassoon Concerto (Neikrug)
 Bassoon Concerto (Panufnik)
 Bassoon Concerto (Rouse)
 Bassoon Concerto (Weber)
 Bassoon Concerto (Zwilich)